Geyaspur is a Panchyat and village. It is  located in Muzaffarpur District, Bihar state, India. The Panchyat has a population of around 20,000.

The most Population Caste Of Village RAJPUT

It is near to the Gandak river which flows from the western side of the village. This Panchyat falls under the Paroo block. It is about 45 km away from Muzaffarpur town towards the west. This village comprises many castes likeRajput s,Bhumiar s  , Yadav, Harijans, Paswans, Barbers, Teli etc. However it is dominated by the RAJPUT caste. There is a harmonious relationship among villagers. There are 4 villages: Geyaspur, Sarmastpur, Mithani, Salahpurin in this Panchyat.

The education facility is very good. The facility is easily available. There are a primary school, middle school, High School (RKSSB High School) and a College. The literacy rate is quite high in this village compared to other adjacent villages. There is a post office in this Panchyat which pincode is 843107. There are 22 Tola in this village.
The Famous Tola Of Geyashpur is tintolia
There are a cricket club in this village. Cricket club's name is Diamond Cricket club. Raman singh is the Captain of Diamond cricket club.

Villages in Muzaffarpur district